Events in 1989 in Japanese television.

Debuts

Ongoing
Music Fair, music (1964–present)
Mito Kōmon, jidaigeki (1969-2011)
Sazae-san, anime (1969–present)
Ōoka Echizen, jidaigeki (1970-1999)
FNS Music Festival, music (1974–present)
Panel Quiz Attack 25, game show (1975–present)
Doraemon, anime (1979-2005)
Kiteretsu Daihyakka, anime (1988-1996)
Soreike! Anpanman, anime (1988–present)
Bubblegum Crisis, anime (1987-1991)

Endings

See also
1989 in anime
List of Japanese television dramas
1989 in Japan
List of Japanese films of 1989

References